Poerua River is a river in the Grey District in the West Coast region of New Zealand's South Island. It flows from Lake Poerua into the Crooked River, which leads to Lake Brunner.

Grey District
Rivers of the West Coast, New Zealand
Rivers of New Zealand